The 2017 Cork Junior Hurling Championship was the 120th staging of the Cork Junior Hurling Championship since its establishment by the Cork County Board in 1895. The championship draw took place on 28 August 2017. The championship began on 15 September 2017 and ended 7 November 2017.

On 7 November 2017, St. Catherine's won the championship following a 0-13 to 0-12 defeat of Brian Dillons in the final. This was their second championship title in the grade and their first since 1983.

Qualification

Duhallow Junior A Hurling Championship 
Round 1

Millstreet 1-15 - 1-13 Freemount

Dromtarriffe 0-23 - 2-15 Castlemagner

Tullylease 0-11 - 2-12 Banteer 

Newmarket 5-19 - 0-15 Kanturk

Kilbrin bye

Round 2 

Kilbrin 1-13 - 0-19 Banteer

Castlemagner 0-12 - 1-19 Freemount 

Tullylease 3-11 - 2-11 Millstreet

Newmarket 1-13 - 2-14 Dromtarriffe

Kanturk bye

Round 3 

Tullylease 1-19 - 1-14 Freemount

Kilbrin 2-13 - 1-15 Newmarket

Milstreet 2-16 - 1-09 Kanturk 

Quarter-Finals

Kilbrin 2-18 - 0-15 Millstreet

Semi-Finals

Kilbrin 5-30 - 1-10 Tullylease

Dromtarriffe 0-10 - 3-14 Banteer

Final

Kilbrin 0-14 - 1-17 Banteer

North Cork Junior A Hurling Championship 
Round 1

Shanballymore 4-17 - 0-10 Ballyclough

Round 2 

Ballyclough 0-09 - 1-15 Liscarroll-Churchtown Gaels

Doneraile 3-04 - 4-20 Ballyhooly

Harbour Rovers 0-11 - 3-12 Clyda Rovers

Castletownroche 0-05 - 4-25 Fermoy

Buttevant 1-15 - 0-17 Kilshannig 

Dromina 2-21 - 2-19 Kilworth AET

Newtownshandrum 2-12 - 3-20 Ballygiblin

Round 3

Kilworth w/o - scr. Castletownroche

Newtownshandrum 1-09 - 3-20 Harbour Rovers

Doneraile 3-13 - 1-16 Kilshannig

Round 4

Dromina 3-21 - 3-08 Doneraile

Fermoy 2-13 - 2-22 Harbour Rovers

Ballygiblin 2-13 - 2-07 Kilworth

Quarter-Finals

Dromina 2-12 - 0-18 Harbour Rovers

Replay: Dromina 2-22 - 3-10 Harbour Rovers 

Ballygiblin 1-10 - 0-12 Buttevant

Clyda Rovers 3-7 - 1-11 Liscarroll-Churchtown Gaels

Shanballymore 0-12 - 0-17 Ballyhooly

Semi-Finals

Ballyhooly 1-15 - 1-15 Clyda Rovers

Replay Ballyhooly 2-16 - 0-13 Clyda Rovers

Ballygiblin 1-15 - 1-16 Dromina

Final

Dromina 3-07 - 1-12 Ballyhooly

Results

Bracket

Round 1

Quarter-finals

St. Catherine's received a bye to the semi-final stage.

Semi-finals

Finals

External links
 2017 Cork JHC results

References

Cork Junior Hurling Championship
Cork Junior Hurling Championship